Daviesia crenulata is a species of flowering plant in the family Fabaceae and is endemic to the south-west of Western Australia. It is a bushy shrub with broadly egg-shaped phyllodes with a sharply-pointed end and wavy edges, and uniformly yellow-orange and maroon flowers.

Description
The phyllodes have a sharply-pointed tip on the end, a heart-shaped base and wavy edges.

Taxonomy and naming
Daviesia crenulata was first formally described in 1853 by Nikolai Turczaninow in the Bulletin de la Société Impériale des Naturalistes de Moscou. The specific epithet (crenulata) means "crenulate", referring to the edge of the phyllodes.

Distribution and habitat
This species of pea grows in heath, mallee-heath and forest and mainly occurs in the Stirling Range in the Avon Wheatbelt, Esperance Plains and Mallee biogeographic regions of south-western Western Australia.

Conservation status
Daviesia crenulata is classified as "not threatened" by the Government of Western Australia Department of Biodiversity, Conservation and Attractions.

References

crenulata
Eudicots of Western Australia
Plants described in 1853
Taxa named by Nikolai Turczaninow